"Pull Yourself Together" is a single by the British indie rock band Hefner.  Their first for Too Pure, it was released in 1998 on CD single and 7" vinyl record formats.

The single was fairly popular.  Although it did not chart, it was the "single of the week" on BBC Radio 1 by Steve Lamacq.

Track listing

The single was released in two formats, with the single having the track listing below, while the 7" only contained the first two tracks.

 "Pull Yourself Together"
 "Christ"
 "Smoking Girlfriend"
 "Wicker Girl"

Cultural references

The title of the single is used by a successful Indiepop night and fanzine based in Manchester.

References

Hefner (band) songs
1998 songs
Too Pure singles